Romulea linaresii is a species of plant in the family Iridaceae. It occurs in many countries around the Mediterranean Sea.

Source

References 

linaresii
Taxa named by Filippo Parlatore
Plants described in 1839